is a railway station in the city of Aisai, Aichi Prefecture, Japan , operated by the Tōkai Transport Service Company (TKJ). It should not be confused with the  Ajiyoshi Station operated by the private railway operator, Meitetsu with which it shares the same name, located 700 meters away.

Lines

Station layout
The station  has one elevated island platform, with the station building located underneath. The station is normally unattended.

Platforms

Adjacent stations

|-
!colspan=5|Tōkai Transport Service Company

Station history
Ajiyoshi Station opened on December 1, 1991.

Passenger statistics
In fiscal 2017, the station was used by an average of 109 passengers daily (boarding passengers only).

Surrounding area
Shirayama Elementary School
Ajiyoshi Junior High School
Ajiyoshi Futagoyama Kofun

See also
 List of Railway Stations in Japan

References

External links

Railway stations in Japan opened in 1991
Railway stations in Aichi Prefecture
Kasugai, Aichi